Angela Marie Bettis (born January 9, 1973) is an American actress, film producer, and director. Following her breakthrough role as Janet Webber in the drama film Girl, Interrupted (1999), she earned acclaim for her portrayals of Carrietta White in the television film Carrie (2002) and the titular character in the psychological horror film May (2002). For May, she won the Brussels International Festival Award for Best Actress, the Catalan International Film Festival Award for Best Actress and the Fangoria Chainsaw Award for Best Actress. She went on to play Belle Cleek in the horror film The Woman (2011) and Mandy in the black comedy film 12 Hour Shift (2020). For 12 Hour Shift, she earned a nomination for the Critics' Choice Award for Best Actress in a Horror Movie.

In addition to her work in film, Bettis also starred in two Broadway productions: The Father in 1996 with Frank Langella and as Abigail Williams in a 2002 revival of Arthur Miller's The Crucible alongside Liam Neeson and Laura Linney.

Life and career
Bettis was born in Austin, Travis County, Texas. Daughter of Richard Joseph Bettis and wife Mary Lynn Guthrie, she has a twin brother, Joseph Edward "Joe" Bettis. She is 5' 3.

Her debut role was a lead in the romantic tragedy, Sparrow, directed by Franco Zeffirelli, at the age of 18. She later went on to star in a film called The Last Best Sunday, before supporting Winona Ryder in Girl, Interrupted and Kim Basinger in Bless the Child.

In 2002, she starred as Abigail Williams in a production of The Crucible on Broadway alongside Laura Linney and Liam Neeson. Bettis is most famous for her work in independent horror films, and especially her working relationship with writer/director Lucky McKee. Her title role in McKee's 2002 film May won her something of a cult following. Since then, she has appeared in McKee's Masters of Horror episode "Sick Girl" and provided a voice-over for his film The Woods. In 2006, their May roles reversed, when McKee acted for Bettis in her directorial debut, Roman, based on a McKee script. In 2011, she played a major role in McKee's adaptation of Jack Ketchum's The Woman. 

Bettis starred as Carrietta White in Carrie, a made-for-TV remake of Brian De Palma's 1976 classic, in which her performance was singled out for praise. Linda Stasi of the New York Post was positively surprised by her performance and stated that Bettis should win an Emmy for her acting. Ron Wertheimer, who wrote for The New York Times, said that Bettis expressed the character's emotions well, and lamented that the film "affords Ms. Bettis few opportunities for such genuine acting". 

She headlined Tobe Hooper's Toolbox Murders, an in-name-only remake of an obscure 1970s horror film. 

She also starred in the crime thriller Scar. She had a guest role on the TV show Dexter's'' fifth season as Emily Birch, the first  victim of Jordan Chase.

Filmography

References

External links
 
 

1973 births
American twins
Living people
Actresses from Austin, Texas
20th-century American actresses
21st-century American actresses
American stage actresses
American film actresses
American television actresses
American web series actresses
Film producers from Texas
American women film producers
Film directors from Texas
American women film directors
Horror film directors